Aurelio Menéndez Menéndez, first Marquess of Ibias (1 May 1927 – 3 January 2018) was a Spanish lawyer and politician who was the Minister of Education between 1976 and 1977.

References

1927 births
2018 deaths
20th-century Spanish lawyers
Academic staff of the Autonomous University of Madrid
Education ministers of Spain
Union of the Democratic Centre (Spain) politicians
University of Oviedo alumni
People from Gijón